Megalonyx (Greek, "large claw") is an extinct genus of ground sloths of the family Megalonychidae, native to North America during the Pliocene and Pleistocene epochs. It became extinct during the Quaternary extinction event at the end of the Rancholabrean of the Pleistocene, living from ~5 million to 11,000 years ago. Megalonyx is descended from Pliometanastes, a genus of ground sloth that had arrived in North America during the Late Miocene, prior to the Great American Biotic Interchange. Megalonyx had the widest distribution of any North American ground sloth, having a range encompassing most of the contiguous United States, extending as far north as Alaska during warm periods.

Taxonomy 

In 1796, Colonel John Stuart sent Thomas Jefferson, shortly before he took office as Vice President of the United States, some fossil bones: a femur fragment, ulna, radius, and foot bones including three large claws. The discoveries were made in a cave in Greenbrier County, Virginia (present-day West Virginia). Jefferson examined the bones and presented his observations in the paper "A Memoir on the Discovery of Certain Bones of a Quadruped of the Clawed Kind in the Western Parts of Virginia" to the American Philosophical Society in Philadelphia on March 10, 1797. In the paper, he named the then unknown animal Megalonyx ("giant claw") and compared each recovered bone to the corresponding bone in a lion. Jefferson did not attempt a definitive taxonomic classification and kept an open mind, writing “Let us only say then, what we may safely say, that he was more than three times as large as the lion”. In his postscript, Jefferson mentions the remains of a Megatherium discovered in Paraguay and notes its anatomical similarities to Megalonyx.

Contrary to the scientific consensus emerging at the time that extinction had played an important role in natural history, Jefferson believed in a "completeness of nature" whose inherent balance did not allow species to go extinct naturally. He asked Lewis and Clark, as they planned their famous expedition in 1804–1806, to keep an eye out for living specimens of Megalonyx, as this would support his case. His idea made no headway and was later shown to be incorrect.

His presentation to the American Philosophical Society in 1797 is often credited as the beginning of vertebrate paleontology in North America. In 1799, Caspar Wistar correctly identified the remains as those of a giant ground sloth. In 1822, Wistar proposed naming the species Megalonyx jeffersonii in honor of the former statesman. Desmarest then published it as such. Megalonyx was first formally named by Richard Harlan in 1825.

Recent research confirms that the sloth bones were discovered in Haynes Cave in Monroe County, West Virginia. For many decades in the twentieth century, the reported origin of Jefferson's "Certain Bones" was Organ Cave in what is now Greenbrier County, West Virginia. This story was popularized in the 1920s by a local man, Andrew Price of Marlinton. The story came under scrutiny when in 1993 two fragments of a Megalonyx scapula were found in Haynes Cave in neighboring Monroe County. Smithsonian paleontologist Frederick Grady presented evidence in 1995 confirming Haynes Cave as the original source of Jefferson's fossil. Jefferson reported that the bones had been found by saltpeter workers. He gave the cave owner's name as Frederic Crower. Correspondence between Jefferson and Colonel Stuart, who sent him the bones, indicates that the cave was located about five miles from Stuart's home and that it contained saltpeter vats. An investigation of property ownership records revealed "Frederic Crower" to be an apparent misspelling of the name Frederic Gromer. Organ Cave was never owned by Gromer, but Haynes Cave was. Two letters written by Tristram Patton, the subsequent owner of Haynes Cave, indicate that this cave was located in Monroe County near Second Creek. Monroe County had originally been part of Greenbrier County; it became a separate county shortly after the discovery of the bones. In his own letters Patton described the cave and indicated that more fossil bones remained inside.

M. jeffersonii is still the most commonly identified species of Megalonyx. It was designated the state fossil of West Virginia in 2008.

M. leptostomus, named by Cope (1893), lived from the Blancan to the Irvingtonian. This species lived from Florida to Texas, north to Kansas and Nebraska, and west to New Mexico, Nevada, Oregon, and Washington. It is about half the size of M. jeffersonii. It evolved into M. wheatleyi, the direct ancestor of M. jeffersonii. Species gradually got larger, with different species mostly based on size and geologic age.

Evolution 
The first wave of Megalonychids came to North America by island-hopping across the Central American Seaway from South America, where ground sloths arose, prior to formation of the Panamanian land bridge. Based on molecular results, its closest living relatives are the three-toed sloths (Bradypus); earlier morphological investigations came to a different conclusion.

M. jeffersonii lived from the Illinoian Stage during the Middle Pleistocene (150,000 years BP) through to the Rancholabrean of the Late Pleistocene (11,000 BP). It belongs to the genus Megalonyx, a name proposed by Thomas Jefferson, future president of the United States, in 1797. (Jefferson's surname was appended to the animal as the specific epithet in 1822 by the French zoologist Anselme Gaëtan Desmarest.) M. jeffersonii was probably descended from M. wheatleyi.

Description 
This is medium-sized among the giant ground sloths. Like other ground sloths, it had a blunt snout, massive jaw, and large peg-like teeth. The hind limbs were plantigrade (flat-footed) and this, along with its stout tail, allowed it to rear up into a semi-erect position to feed on tree leaves. The forelimbs had three highly developed claws that were probably used to strip leaves and tear off branches.

Paleobiology 

During excavations at Tarkio Valley in southwest Iowa, an adult Megalonyx was found in direct association with two juveniles of different ages, suggesting that adults cared for young of different generations.

Habitat 
Megalonyx ranged over much of North and Central America. Their remains have been found as far north as Alaska and the Yukon during interglacial intervals. 

M. jeffersonii, also known as Jefferson's ground sloth, was apparently the most wide-ranging giant ground sloth. Fossils are known from many Pleistocene sites in the United States, including most of the states east of the Rocky Mountains as well as along the west coast. It was the only ground sloth to range as far north as the present-day Yukon. Jefferson's ground sloth dwelled primarily in woodlands and forest, although they likely occupied a variety of habitats within these broad systems. Two recent studies were able to link directly dated specimens from the terminal Pleistocene with regional paleoenvironmental records, demonstrating that these particular animals were associated with spruce dominated, mixed conifer-hardwood habitat. 

In late 2010, the first specimen ever found in Colorado was discovered at the Ziegler Reservoir site near Snowmass Village (in the Rocky Mountains at an elevation of ). The Firelands ground sloth fossil dated between 11,727 and 11,424 BCE represents the earliest-known hunting activity by Ohioan Paleo-Indians.

References

Citations

Other sources 
  (1871) Preliminary report on the vertebrata discovered in the Port Kennedy Bone Cave. American Philosophical Society, 12:73-102.
  (1893) A preliminary report on the vertebrate paleontology of the Llano Estacado. 4th Annual Report on the Geological Survey of Texas: 136pp.
  (1968) Plio-Pleistocene megalonychid sloths of North America. Bulletin of the Florida State Museum Biological Sciences, 12(5):213-296.

External links 
 Sloth Central
 Smithsonian National Zoological Park: At the Zoo - Slow and Steady Sloths

Prehistoric sloths
Prehistoric placental genera
Pliocene xenarthrans
Pliocene mammals of North America
Pleistocene xenarthrans
Pleistocene mammals of North America
Blancan
Hemphillian
Irvingtonian
Rancholabrean
Fossils of Canada
Fossils of Guatemala
Fossils of Honduras
Fossils of Mexico
Fossils of the United States
Fossil taxa described in 1825
Taxa named by Richard Harlan
Symbols of West Virginia
Thomas Jefferson
Ringold Formation Miocene Fauna